Ohnišov is a municipality and village in Rychnov nad Kněžnou District in the Hradec Králové Region of the Czech Republic. It has about 500 inhabitants.

Administrative parts
The village of Zákraví is an administrative part of Ohnišov.

References

Villages in Rychnov nad Kněžnou District